Cynwyd station is a SEPTA Regional Rail station in Bala Cynwyd, Pennsylvania. Located at Conshohocken State Road (PA 23) and Bala Avenue, it is the last station along the Cynwyd Line. The station includes a 41-space parking lot.

Service formerly continued farther northwest, crossing the Schuylkill River via the massive Manayunk Bridge, and ultimately terminating at Ivy Ridge station. This service ended in September 1986 when the integrity of the Manayunk Bridge was questioned. The massive span was shedding pieces of concrete due to spalling. Further investigation by Urban Engineers determined that the bridge was safe and only needed surface work to end the spalling. In 1999, construction finished on a project to stabilize and refurbish the bridge, but train service did not resume as expected.

SEPTA received criticism for refusing to reinstate service north of Cynwyd after the Manayunk Bridge was deemed safe. Plans to re-extend service floated around for approximately a decade until 2008 when SEPTA dismantled the line north of Cynwyd after leasing the line for the Cynwyd Heritage Trail and Ivy Ridge Trail, respectively.

Station layout

References

External links
SEPTA – Cynwyd Station
 Conshohocken State Road entrance from Google Maps Street View

SEPTA Regional Rail stations
Former Pennsylvania Railroad stations
Lower Merion Township, Pennsylvania
Railway stations in Montgomery County, Pennsylvania
Railway stations in the United States opened in 1890